The 2020–21 Southern Conference men's basketball season began with practices in October 2020, followed by the start of the 2020–21 NCAA Division I men's basketball season in November. Conference play begins in January 2021 and will conclude in March 2021.

Preseason Awards
Preseason awards were announced by the league office on November 11, 2020.

Preseason men's basketball coaches poll
(First place votes in parenthesis)
 UNC Greensboro (4) 76
 Furman (5) 74
 East Tennessee State (1) 63
 Mercer 56
 Wofford 47
 Western Carolina 44
 Chattanooga 38
 Samford 23
 VMI 15
 The Citadel 14

Preseason men's basketball media poll
(First place votes in parenthesis)
 Furman (16) 278
 UNC Greensboro (9) 274
 East Tennessee State (4) 211
 Mercer (1) 190
 Wofford 184
 Western Carolina 175
 Chattanooga 150
 Samford 79
 VMI 61
 The Citadel 48

Conference matrix

All-Southern Conference awards

Southern Conference men's basketball weekly awards

References